Axinidris gabonica is a species of ant in the genus Axinidris. Described by Snelling in 2007, the species is known to inhabit forests in Gabon.

References

Endemic fauna of Gabon
Axinidris
Hymenoptera of Africa
Insects described in 2007